"Guantanamera" is a Cuban song by Joseíto Fernández, recorded by many artists.

Guantanamera may also refer to:

 Guantanamera (The Sandpipers album), 1966
 Guantanamera (cigar), a cigar brand
 Guantanamera (film), a 1995 Cuban comedy film